L. Vann Pettaway (born c. 1957) is the former men's basketball coach at Alabama A&M. He served 25 years as the Bulldogs' head coach. During his tenure at Alabama A&M, the school moved up to Division I and competed in the 2005 NCAA Tournament. He has compiled over 400 wins.  In 2011, Pettaway was fired from his position as Alabama A&M's head coach.

Pettaway graduated from Alabama A&M in 1980. He also received a master's degree in 1991.

Pettaway is married to his wife Glenn. They have two children.

References

Bio on vannpettaway.com website

1950s births
Living people
Alabama A&M Bulldogs basketball coaches
Alabama A&M Bulldogs basketball players
American men's basketball coaches
Basketball coaches from Alabama
Basketball players from Alabama
Junior college men's basketball players in the United States
Sportspeople from Selma, Alabama
American men's basketball players